Khukri Rum is an iconic Nepalese oak vatted dark rum launched in 1959. Khukri Rum comes in three varieties; Khukri XXX Rum, Coronation Khukri XXX Rum and Khukri Spice Rum. All variants are matured for a minimum of eight months and have alcohol content of 42.8%. Khukri Rum is produced in Kathmandu, Nepal by The Nepal Distilleries Private Limited and is available domestically in all parts of Nepal as well as exported to Japan, South Korea, Hong Kong, Italy, the United States, Dubai and Australia....

History and production
Nepal Distilleries Private Limited started producing Khukri Rum in 1959 in Kathmandu, Nepal. Initially the company started distilling alcohol from pot stills. Those initial pot stills are on display in its factory premises and the company now uses three fractionating columns for distillation of alcohol. Distilled from fermented molasses, the Khukri Rum is aged for a minimum of eight months in wooden vats. The producer claims over 80% market share in Nepal and that it has export markets in Japan, South Korea, Hong Kong, Italy, United States, Dubai and Australia.

Varieties
Khukri Rum comes in three varieties; Khukri XXX Rum, Coronation Khukri XXX Rum and Khukri Spice Rum.

Khukri XXX Rum
Khukri XXX Rum (or simply called Khukri Rum) is the company's flagship brand and was launched in 1959. Khukri Rum was winner of the Gold Award at the International Rum Festival in 2002 in Canada. The rum is made using spring water from the Himalayas. The rum is distilled from fermented molasses, matured for a minimum of eight months and has alcohol content of 42.8%.

Coronation Khukri XXX Rum
Coronation Khukri XXX Rum (a.k.a. Coronation Khukri and Coronation Khukri Rum) was launched in 1974 to mark the coronation of the 12th King of Nepal, Birendra Bir Bikram Shah Dev. The bottle is shaped as a Nepalese Gurkha dagger Kukri. Coronation Khukri rum bottles are hand made and contain 375 millilitres of rum. The rum is distilled from fermented molasses, matured for a minimum of eight months and has alcohol content of 42.8%. Coronation Khukri was awarded Gold Medal: Dark Rum in 2006 by the "International Sugar Cane Spirits Tasting Competition" in Ybor City.

Khukri Spice Rum
Spices used in Khukri Spice Rum are hand-picked in the Himalayas, and include cloves, cardamom and cinnamon.

See also
Khukuri beer

References

External links
 

Rums
Alcohol in Nepal
Food and drink companies of Nepal
Distilleries of Asia
Nepalese brands
1959 establishments in Nepal